The UK Singles Chart is one of many music charts compiled by the Official Charts Company that calculates the best-selling singles of the week in the United Kingdom. Before 2004, the chart was only based on the sales of physical singles. This list shows singles that peaked in the Top 10 of the UK Singles Chart during 1987, as well as singles which peaked in 1986 and 1988 but were in the top 10 in 1987. The entry date is when the single appeared in the top 10 for the first time (week ending, as published by the Official Charts Company, which is six days after the chart is announced).

One-hundred and fifty-three singles were in the top ten in 1987. Ten singles from 1986 remained in the top 10 for several weeks at the beginning of the year, while "Heaven is a Place on Earth" by Belinda Carlisle and "When I Fall in Love" by Nat King Cole were both released in 1987 but did not reach their peak until 1988. "Cry Wolf" by A-ha and "Is This Love?" by Alison Moyet were the singles from 1986 to reach their peak in 1987. Thirty-five artists scored multiple entries in the top 10 in 1987. Beastie Boys, LL Cool J, The Pogues, Rick Astley and Wet Wet Wet were among the many artists who achieved their first UK charting top 10 single in 1987.

The 1986 Christmas number-one, "Reet Petite" by Jackie Wilson, remained at number-one for the first three weeks of 1987. The first new number-one single of the year was "Jack Your Body" by Steve "Silk" Hurley. Overall, nineteen different singles peaked at number-one in 1987, with Madonna and the Pet Shop Boys (2) having the joint most singles hit that position.

Background

Multiple entries
One-hundred and fifty-three singles charted in the top 10 in 1987, with one-hundred and forty-three singles reaching their peak this year. Two songs were recorded by several artists with each version reaching the top 10:
"I Found Lovin'" –  Fatback Band, Steve Walsh
"When I Fall in Love" – Nat King Cole, Rick Astley

Thirty-five artists scored multiple entries in the top 10 in 1987. Madonna secured the record for most top 10 hits in 1987 with five hit singles.

Boy George was one of a number of artists with two top-ten entries, including the number-one single "Everything I Own". A-ha, Curiosity Killed the Cat, Fleetwood Mac, The Pogues and Wet Wet Wet were among the other artists who had multiple top 10 entries in 1987.

Chart debuts
Sixty-six artists achieved their first top 10 single in 1987, either as a lead or featured artist. Of these, ten went on to record another hit single that year: Black, Bruce Willis, Curiosity Killed the Cat, Mirage, The Pogues, Taffy, Terence Trent D'Arby, T'Pau, Wet Wet Wet and Whitesnake. Pepsi & Shirlie and Rick Astley both had two other entries in their breakthrough year.

The following table (collapsed on desktop site) does not include acts who had previously charted as part of a group and secured their first top 10 solo single. 

Notes
Al Jarreau had his first top 10 solo single in 1987 with the theme song to Moonlighting, charting at number 8, but he had made been a part of the "We Are the World" charity single by USA for Africa two years earlier. 

Mark King was one of the featured artists on the Ferry Aid charity effort "Let It Be". His previous top 10 entries had all been as a member of Level 42. Similarly, Andy Bell of Erasure, Curiosity Killed the Cat's singer Ben Volpeliere-Pierrot, Paul King, who was in new wave band King, and Mark Knopfler from Dire Straits all sang lead vocals on this single, their first credits independent of their bands. Ruby Turner scored her first top 10 single as a credited singer, Taffy (one additional hit in her debut year) and Pepsi & Shirlie (this was one of 3 entries for the group this year). The other main acts on "Let It Be" who already had top 10 singles to their name were Boy George, Edwin Starr, Gary Moore, Jaki Graham, Kate Bush, Keren Woodward (of Bananarama), Kim Wilde, Mel and Kim, Nick Kamen and Nik Kershaw.

Bill Medley had his only top 10 single that wasn't as part of The Righteous Brothers in 1987, his duet with and theme from Dirty Dancing, "(I've Had) The Time of My Life" with Jennifer Warnes peaking at number six.

Songs from films
Original songs from various films entered the top 10 throughout the year. These included "It Doesn't Have to Be This Way" (from Police Academy 4: Citizens on Patrol), "Coming Around Again" (Heartburn), "Nothing's Gonna Stop Us Now" (Mannequin), "I Want Your Sex" (Beverley Hills Cop II), "The Living Daylights" (The Living Daylights), "Causing a Commotion", "The Look of Love" and "Who's That Girl" (Who's That Girl), "La Bamba" (La Bamba), "She's on It" (Krush Groove), "Somewhere Out There" (An American Tail) and "(I've Had) The Time of My Life" (Dirty Dancing).

Additionally, "Wild One" appeared in several films at the end of the 1980s, including Adventures in Babysitting, Crocodile Dundee II, Problem Child and Problem Child 2. "When a Man Loves a Woman" was re-released to promote the soundtrack to Platoon. The original Bee Gees release of "Jive Talkin" from 1977 was included on the Saturday Night Fever soundtrack. "Full Metal Jacket (I Want to Be Your Drill Instructor)" featured a compilation of drill cadences from Full Metal Jacket and was used to promote the film.

Charity singles
A number of songs recorded for charity reached the top 10 in the charts in 1987. A group of popular artists united to raise money towards victims of the Zeebrugge Disaster. They released a version of "Let It Be" – originally by The Beatles – under the name Ferry Aid, reaching number-one for 3 weeks from 4 April 1987.

The Comic Relief single was a cover of the classic Christmas song "Rockin' Around the Christmas Tree" recording by Mel Smith and Kim Wilde, parodying the style of the singing duo Mel and Kim. The song peaked at number three on 26 December 1987.

Best-selling singles
Rick Astley had the best-selling single of the year with "Never Gonna Give You Up". The single spent nine weeks in the top 10 (including five weeks at number one), sold over 810,000 copies and was certified by the BPI. "Nothing's Gonna Stop Us Now" by Starship came in second place, selling more than 740,000 copies and losing out by around 70,000 sales. Whitney Houston's "I Wanna Dance with Somebody (Who Loves Me)", "You Win Again" from Bee Gees and "China in Your Hand" by T'Pau made up the top five. Singles by Mel and Kim, Ben E. King, Pet Shop Boys, The Firm and M|A|R|R|S were also in the top ten best-selling singles of the year.

Top-ten singles
Key

Entries by artist

The following table shows artists who achieved two or more top 10 entries in 1987, including singles that reached their peak in 1986. The figures include both main artists and featured artists, while appearances on ensemble charity records are also counted for each artist.

Notes

 "Heaven Is a Place on Earth" reached its peak of number-one on 16 January 1988 (week ending).
 "Reet Petite" reached number-one in 1986 after being reissued, 29 years after its initial release and two years after Jackie Wilson's death. It originally peaked at number 6 in 1957. This was the longest gap between a song's release and it rising to the top of the charts until Tony Christie's "Is This the Way to Amarillo?" in 2005.
"Stand by Me" originally peaked outside the top 10 at number 27 upon its initial release in 1961. It was re-released in 1987 after being used in a television advertising campaign for Levi's jeans.
"When a Man Loves a Woman" originally peaked at number 4 upon its initial release in 1966. It was re-released in 1987 after being used in a television advertising campaign for Levi's jeans.
"I Get the Sweetest Feeling" originally peaked at number 9 on its initial release in 1972.
 "Let It Be" was recorded to support relief efforts following the Zeebrugge Disaster.
 Ferry Aid was a collective who recorded a cover version of The Beatles song "Let It Be" to benefit survivors and victims families affected by the Zeebrugge Disaster.
 "Let It Be" had vocal contributions from more than 70 artists, but only those on lead vocals have this as a separate credit in the "Entries by artist" table. This includes Boy George, Keren Woodward (of Bananarama), Paul McCartney, Pepsi & Shirley and Taffy.
 "Hold Me Now" was the Ireland's winning entry at the Eurovision Song Contest in 1987.
 George Michael had uncredited lead vocals on Boogie Box High's "Jive Talkin'".
 "My Baby Just Cares for Me" was used in a television advert for Chanel No. 5 in 1987. It was re-released as a single to capitalise on its popularity, having originally peaked at number 82 two years earlier, becoming Nina Simone's first top 10 hit in 18 years.
 "Always on My Mind" was released after Pet Shop Boys covered the song on Love Me Tender, a programme marking ten years since the death of Elvis Presley.
 Released as the official single for Comic Relief.
 Comedian Mel Smith and singer Kim Wilde parodied their namesakes, the duo Mel and Kim, for the Comic Relief cover of "Rockin' Around the Christmas Tree". The song was recorded under the identical name, Mel & Kim.
 "When I Fall in Love" (Nat King Cole version) originally peaked at number 2 on its initial release in 1957. 
 Figure includes single that peaked in 1986.
 Figure includes an appearance on the Ferry Aid charity single "Let It Be" in aid of the Zeebrugge Disaster.
 Figure includes three top 10 hits with the group Erasure.
 Figure includes three top 10 hits with the group Level 42.
 Figure includes single that first charted in 1986 but peaked in 1987.
 Figure includes two top 10 hits with the group Curiosity Killed the Cat.
 Figure includes a top 10 hit with the group Bananarama.

See also
1987 in British music
List of number-one singles from the 1980s (UK)

References
General

Specific

External links
1987 singles chart archive at the Official Charts Company (click on relevant week)
Official Top 40 best-selling songs of 1987 at the Official Charts Company

United Kingdom Top 10
Top 10 singles
1987